Edward Webb may refer to:
Edward Webb (politician), British politician
Edward Webb (silversmith), Colonial American silversmith
Edward Doran Webb, British architect
Rake Yohn (real name Edward Webb), American television personality
Edward Webb and Sons, British seed merchants